Virgin Rail Group was formed by the Virgin Group to bid for rail franchises in the United Kingdom during the privatisation of British Rail in the late 1990s.

United Kingdom operations

Origins 
Virgin bid for a number of franchises, including Gatwick Express, InterCity CrossCountry and InterCity West Coast. It was successful in winning the latter two, and Virgin CrossCountry and Virgin West Coast began operations in January and March 1997 respectively. Both franchises were scheduled to run for 15 years.

In October 1998, Virgin Group sold 49% of the shares in Virgin Rail Group to Stagecoach.

21st century 
In March 2000, Virgin was shortlisted to bid for the InterCity East Coast franchise. In January 2002 the Strategic Rail Authority scrapped the refranchising process and awarded a two-year extension to GNER.

In the wake of the collapse of Railtrack and the inability of Network Rail to deliver on the  West Coast Main Line upgrade, both the Virgin CrossCountry and Virgin West Coast franchises were suspended in favour of management contracts in July 2002.  While the terms of the West Coast franchise were renegotiated, agreement could not be reached on CrossCountry and it was retendered in 2007.

Virgin was again shortlisted to bid for the InterCity East Coast franchise in 2004, but was not successful; the franchise was won by Sea Containers, parent company of then train operator Great North Eastern Railway. Virgin was shortlisted for the New CrossCountry franchise by the Department for Transport (DfT) in September 2006, but was not successful and the Virgin CrossCountry franchise transferred to Arriva in November 2007.

After Sea Containers was stripped of the East Coast franchise due to poor financial management, Virgin was again shortlisted for the InterCity East Coast franchise in February 2007, but was not successful, as the franchise was won by National Express. This bid had a 10% shareholding by the incumbent, Sea Containers.

Virgin was awarded a contract by the DfT in July 2008 to manage the introduction of 106 extra Class 390 Pendolino carriages.

Virgin was shortlisted for the InterCity West Coast franchise by the DfT in March 2011. In August 2012, the Department awarded FirstGroup the new franchise. Virgin felt that the methodology used to award the franchise was flawed, and Richard Branson said it was unlikely Virgin would bid for any future franchises. When the DfT did not respond to Virgin's concerns, it launched proceedings for a judicial review. While preparing its case for the judicial review, the government discovered significant technical flaws in the way the franchise process had been conducted, and cancelled the competition, vindicating Virgin's protests.

In December 2012, Virgin was awarded a 23-month management contract to run the West Coast franchise until November 2014; the contract was extended in stages until March 2020.

in May 2013 there was a controversy regarding new uniforms, with claims that the blouses were too revealing and potentially exposed dark bras to the public. Virgin Rail Group responded to this by offering a voucher worth £20 to allow employees to purchase a top to wear underneath the new blouses.

In March 2015, Virgin Trains East Coast commenced operating the InterCity East Coast franchise; the company was a joint venture between Stagecoach (90%) and Virgin Group (10%). Due to the line performing below VTEC's expectations, it was announced in May 2018 that the contract would be terminated early by the government. VTEC ceased operating on 23 June 2018 and operations passed to a government-owned operator, London North Eastern Railway.

In November 2016, the government announced that the InterCity West Coast franchise would be replaced by a new franchise named the West Coast Partnership, which included operating High Speed 2 (HS2). Services are planned to begin on the first phase of HS2 in 2026. The DfT requires that the new operator have experience in operating high speed trains (250 mph) and infrastructure. To satisfy this requirement, Stagecoach (50%) and Virgin (20%) bid in a joint venture with SNCF (30%). In April 2019 Stagecoach revealed that it had been disqualified from the franchises it was bidding for, including the West Coast Partnership, thus Virgin Trains ceased in December 2019.

The application was later withdrawn.

Non United Kingdom rail operations
In 1998 Virgin Rail, as part of the Capital Rail consortium, was shortlisted for an Australian high-speed rail service from Sydney to Canberra.

In November 2018, it was announced that the Virgin Group would be acquiring a shareholding in Brightline to form Virgin Trains USA in 2019. However, in August 2020, Virgin Group withdrew from Brightline.

In popular culture
Virgin's role in the privatisation of British Rail was lampooned in Thomas the Privatised Tank Engine,  a 1994 parody children's book published by Private Eye magaZine. A send-up of The Railway Series by the Reverend W. Awdry, it mentions characters such as "Gordon the Virgin Engine" (Gordon the Big Engine) and "The Bearded Controller" (The Fat Controller, reimagined as Richard Branson).

References

External links

British companies established in 1997
Holding companies of the United Kingdom
Post-privatisation British railway companies
Railway companies established in 1997
Stagecoach Group rail services
Virgin Trains